Areca is a genus of single-stemmed palms.

Areca may also refer to:

Areca nut, also known as betel nut, from the species Areca catechu
Areca palm, a common name for Dypsis lutescens
Areca Backup, software

See also
Arecaceae, the palm family